Dolly Ramadhan Gultom (born 5 March 1993) is an Indonesian professional footballer who plays as a right-back and midfielder for Liga 2 club PSCS Cilacap.

Club career

Sulut United
In 2019, Dolly Gultom signed a one-year contract with Indonesian Liga 2 club Sulut United.

Muba Babel United
He was signed for Muba Babel United to play in Liga 2 in the 2020 season. This season was suspended on 27 March 2020 due to the COVID-19 pandemic. The season was abandoned and was declared void on 20 January 2021.

PSM Makassar
On 24 August 2021, Gultom confirmed his transfer to PSM Makassar. Gultom made his debut on 12 September 2021 in a match against Madura United at the Gelora Bung Karno Madya Stadium, Jakarta.

PSCS Cilacap
On 17 June 2022, it was announced that Gultom would be joining PSCS Cilacap for the 2022-23 Liga 2 campaign.

References

External links
 Dolly Gultom at Soccerway
 Dolly Gultom at Liga Indonesia

1993 births
Association football midfielders
Sportspeople from Jakarta
Indonesian footballers
Indonesian Premier Division players
Persis Solo players
Liga 1 (Indonesia) players
Pelita Bandung Raya players
People of Batak descent
Living people